Sauteria is a genus of liverwort in the family Cleveaceae. It contains the following species:

 Sauteria alpina (Nees & Bisch.) Nees
 Sauteria berteroana Mont. [Unresolved]
 Sauteria chilensis (Lindenb. ex Mont.) Grolle
 Sauteria grandis S.O. Lindberg [Unresolved]
 Sauteria inflata C. Gao & G.C. Zhang
 Sauteria japonica (Shimizu & S. Hatt.) S. Hatt.
 Sauteria spongiosa (Kashyap) S. Hatt.
 Sauteria yatsuensis S. Hatt.

References

External links 

Marchantiales
Marchantiales genera
Taxonomy articles created by Polbot